The Sanderson Formation is a geologic formation in Kentucky. It preserves fossils dating back to the Carboniferous period.

See also
 List of fossiliferous stratigraphic units in Kentucky

References
 

Devonian Kentucky
Carboniferous Kentucky
Devonian southern paleotemperate deposits
Carboniferous southern paleotemperate deposits
Carboniferous southern paleotropical deposits